Seven Sundays is a 1994 French-Italian comedy film directed by Jean-Charles Tacchella.

Cast
 Thierry Lhermitte: Dodo Martin 
 Maurizio Nichetti: Jesus 
 Rod Steiger: Benjamin 
 Marie-France Pisier: Marion 
 Susan Blakely: Alice 
 Molly Ringwald: Janet 
 Nancy Valen: Nicky 
 Monique Mannen: Gloria 
 Peggy O'Neal: Geraldine 
 Jack G. Spirtos: Quinquina 
 Suzanne Turner: Celia

References

External links 
 

1994 films
Italian comedy films
French comedy films
1994 comedy films
Films directed by Jean-Charles Tacchella
Films set in the United States
1990s Italian films
1990s French films